The 1st Golden Trailer Awards (GTAs) were held on 21 September 1999 in New York City, to honor the best in film promotion that 1999 had to offer, including film trailers, posters and TV advertisements.

Background

The Golden Trailers were created by siblings Evelyn Brady-Watters and Monica Brady, in order to properly represent the hard working people who work in film marketing, who are not honored by the Academy of Motion Picture Arts and Sciences (Oscars).

List of winners and nominees

Winners and names of categories [1] in bold

Best Action Trailer - The Matrix
· Star Wars: Episode I – The Phantom Menace
· Blade

Most Original Trailer - Run Lola Run
· The Blair Witch Project
· The Minus Man
· The Messenger: The Story of Joan of Arc

Best Edit - The Matrix
· Blade
· Bringing Out The Dead

Best Trailer in Show - The Matrix
· Austin Powers: The Spy Who Shagged Me
· Bringing Out The Dead

Best Trailer of the Decade - Se7en
· Pulp Fiction
· Dumb and Dumber
· Face/Off
· Fargo (1996 film)

Best Comedy Trailer - Austin Powers: The Spy Who Shagged Me (Trailer #1)
· Austin Powers: The Spy Who Shagged Me (Trailer #2)
· Analyze This

Best Art and Commerce - The Matrix
· Xiu Xiu: The Sent Down Girl
· Buffalo '66

Best Music - Out of Sight
· Run Lola Run
· Swing

Best Drama Trailer - Good Will Hunting
· Tea with Mussolini
· Jakob the Liar

Trashiest Trailer - Cruel Intentions
· Cousin Bette
· Detroit Rock City

Best Foreign Trailer - Three Seasons
· Xiu Xiu: The Sent Down Girl
· Lucie Aubrac

Best Horror/Thriller Trailer - The Blair Witch Project
· A Perfect Murder
· I Still Know What You Did Last Summer

Best Voiceover - The Blair Witch Project
· The Beach
· Bringing Out The Dead

The Dark and Stormy Night Award - 8mm
· Snow Falling on Cedars
· The Mask of Zorro

Best Trailer with No Budget - Return of the Masterminds
· Get Real (film)
· Apocalypse II: Revelation

Best Animation/Family Trailer - A Bug's Life
· Mr. Magoo
· Inspector Gadget

Golden Fleece Award - 8mm
· Armageddon
· Jane Austen's Mafia

Best Documentary Trailer - Return with Honor
· Unmade Beds
· Buena Vista Social Club

Best Romance Trailer - Great Expectations
· Prague Duet
· Ever After (film)

See also
 1998 in film
 70th Academy Awards
 51st BAFTA Film Awards
 56th Golden Globe Awards

References
 http://www.goldentrailer.com/gta1-nominees

Golden Trailer Awards, 01